Ponca is an unincorporated community and census-designated place (CDP) in Newton County, Arkansas, United States. Ponca has a post office with ZIP code 72670. Ponca is well known for its access to the Buffalo National River, which is a hub for naturalist as well as photography and hiking tourism. Ponca is also known for the regular sightings of elk, which reside in the Boxley Valley.

Per the 2020 census, the population was 30.

Demographics

2020 census

Note: the US Census treats Hispanic/Latino as an ethnic category. This table excludes Latinos from the racial categories and assigns them to a separate category. Hispanics/Latinos can be of any race.

External links
 Newton County Historical Society

References

Unincorporated communities in Newton County, Arkansas
Unincorporated communities in Arkansas
Census-designated places in Newton County, Arkansas
Census-designated places in Arkansas